Frants Gufler (born 11 October 1957 in Copenhagen, Denmark) is a Danish curler and curling coach.

He participated in the 2002 Winter Olympics where Danish men's team finished in seventh place.

Teams

Record as a coach of national teams

References

External links
 
 

Living people
1957 births
Sportspeople from Copenhagen
Curlers at the 2002 Winter Olympics
Olympic curlers of Denmark
Danish male curlers
Danish curling champions
Danish curling coaches
20th-century Danish people